Osen Church is a parish church of the Church of Norway in Osen municipality in Trøndelag county, Norway. It is located in the village of Osen. It is the church for the Osen parish which is part of the Fosen prosti (deanery) in the Diocese of Nidaros. The white, wooden church was built in a long church style in 1877 using plans drawn up by the architect Haakon Thorsen. The church seats about 300 people.

History
The earliest existing historical records of the church date back to the year 1589, but the church may not have been new that year. The first church in Osen was built in the middle ages. In 1645, the old church underwent significant repairs. The historical records of the church are not clear, but there is evidence that a new church was built on the site in 1655 or in 1716, but those are not confirmed. By 1834, the church was in poor condition so planning began for a new church building. In 1837 the church was torn down and replaced with a new church on the same foundation, however, before the building could be completed it was blown over in a large storm so construction had to begin again. The new church was finally completed in 1840.

See also
List of churches in Nidaros

References

Osen
Churches in Trøndelag
Long churches in Norway
Wooden churches in Norway
19th-century Church of Norway church buildings
Churches completed in 1877
16th-century establishments in Norway